The Ohio Hi-Point Career Center is a career–technical school that provides career–technical training to high school students and adults in west-central Ohio.  Founded in 1974, Ohio Hi-Point (OHP) Career Center in Bellefontaine, Ohio, is a two-year career-technical school district serving 11th and 12th grade students in 14 partner school districts covering five counties, which comprises the career-technical planning district (CTPD). Students may also opt to remain at their partner school and specialize in one of Ohio High-Point’s fifty-two satellite programs. Career-technical programs offered at OHP are in the career fields of agriculture and animal science, arts and communication, business, engineering and manufacturing, health sciences, human and public service and transportation. The high school services students from Bellefontaine High School, Benjamin Logan High School, Indian Lake High School, Waynesfield-Goshen High School, Upper Scioto Valley High School, Riverside High School, Mechanicsburg High School, Triad High School, Kenton High School, Ridgemont High School, Urbana High School, Marysville High School, West Liberty-Salem High School, and Graham High School.

About the school

Students and curriculum 
The two-year career-technical high school serves 11th and 12th grade students from 14 partner school districts. Twenty-four career training programs are offered to provide technical training in the areas of: Service and Business Technologies, Mechanical and Industrial Technologies, Agriculture Technologies, Construction Technologies, and College Tech Prep. High school students can also opt to remain within their communities and specialize in one of OHP's 52 Satellite Programs.  Programs are available in all five counties OHP services, including Auglaize, Union, Champaign, Hardin, and Logan.  Programs exist in Teaching Professions, Construction Trades, Health Technologies, Supply Chain Management, Aviation, and Business and Agriculture.  The School of Adult and Continuing Education services adults looking for a new career or the opportunity to refresh or renew their skills.  Programs exist in Health Occupations, Business and Industry, HVAC, nursing and more.  The school also offers Adult Basic Literacy Education and GED Training and testing.  Students in both high school and adult programs have opportunities to earn college credits.

Location 

Because this is now a school campus, the highest point is accessible to the public during the week.

History 

Many of the original buildings still remain and have been renovated to house career training programs or office space. Ohio Hi-Point became a school district in 1970, when local and state officials created the Ohio Hi-Point Vocational-Technical District, and appointed a nine-member board to govern operations. The school did not open its doors to students, however, until September 1974, after voters approved a levy.

New programs were added to the six original offerings, and 700 students enrolled when the school moved into its new main building in 1975.

A $1.9 million addition to the main building in early 1995 brought more classroom space and a technology center. Later that same year, the school's name was changed from Ohio Hi-Point Joint Vocational School to Ohio Hi-Point Career Center.

For many years the highest point in Ohio served as home to the Bellefontaine Air Force Station. Personnel of the 664th Aircraft Control and Warning Squadron manned the site during the 1950s and 60s, during the peak of the Cold War, watching for attacks coming over the pole from Russia.

External links 
 Ohio Hi-Point Career Center

Educational institutions established in 1974
High schools in Logan County, Ohio
Vocational schools in Ohio
Public high schools in Ohio
1974 establishments in Ohio
Bellefontaine, Ohio